Mahinthrathirat (1539–1569) was king of Ayutthaya 1564 to 1568 and again in 1569. He ruled his first reign as a vassal of Toungoo Burma before restoring his father in 1568 as the sovereign king. He became king again in 1569 after his father's death during the Third Siege of Ayutthaya by Toungoo forces. Mahinthrathirat was the last monarch of the Suphannaphum Dynasty as the kingdom fell to the Burmese in 1569. Mahinthrathirat was known for his efforts to counter Burmese and Phitsanulok power by seeking alliance with Setthathirath of Lan Xang.

A prince far from the throne

Prince Mahinthrathirat was a son of Maha Chakkraphat and Queen Suriyothai. Mahinthrathirat had an elder brother Prince Ramesuan the Uparaja - then heir to the throne. In 1548, Tabinshweti marched the Burmese armies to invade Ayutthaya. Mahinthrathirat joined his family to battle the Burmese. However, his mother Queen Sri Suriyothai was killed in battle.

Wars with Bayinnaung

Bayinnaung, brother-in-law of Tabinshweti, led the Burmese to invade Ayutthaya again in 1563. Bayinnaung laid the siege on Ayutthaya in 1564, and installed Mahin as the vassal king on 18 February 1564.

Maha Thammarachathirat, the King of Phitsanulok and Maha Chakkrapat's handful noble, had allied himself with Bayinnaung since the war of 1563. Maha Chakkrapat sought an alliance with Setthathirat of Lan Xang, through the marriage of his daughter Thepkasattri, but Maha Thammarachathirat informed Bayinnaung about the arranged marriage and alliances. Bayinnaung then kidnapped Thepkasatri on her way to Vientiane.  This forced Maha Chakkrapat to abdicate the throne to his son Mahinthrathirat, who planned a joint-attack on Phitsanulok with Setthathirat.  Following that failed attack, Mahinthrathirat urged his father to return to regal power in the ensuing crisis.

Fall of Ayutthaya

Bayinnaung then led the Burmese armies against Ayutthaya with support from Maha Thammarachathirat. The Burmese laid siege to Ayutthaya, during which, Maha Chakkrapat fell ill and died (on 15 April 1569, according to the Burmese chronicles).  Mahinthrathirat assumed the throne again. In spite of several months of efforts, Ayutthaya stood the siege. Bayinnaung then bribed Phraya Chakri, a captured Siamese general, to be a spy. Mahinthrathirat embraced the returned general with trust and appointed Phraya Chakri commander of the Siamese defenses. Phraya Chakri was able to place the less-trained and incompetent troops in the front of the Burmese attack, and thus were easily defeated. The city was taken on 2 August 1569, after nine months.

Bayinnuang installed Maha Thammarachathirat as the King of Ayutthaya on 29 September 1569, tributary to Pegu. Mahinthrathirat along with his family and the nobility were captured and taken to Pegu. Mahinthrathirat died in the same year on the way.

Ancestry

Notes

References

Bibliography
 
 
 
 
 
 

Suphannaphum dynasty
Kings of Ayutthaya
1539 births
1569 deaths
16th-century monarchs in Asia
Princes of Ayutthaya
16th-century Thai people